George B. Belting (July 15, 1914 – August 31, 1998) was a member of the Wisconsin State Assembly.

Biography
Belting was born on July 15, 1914, in De Soto, Wisconsin. He later moved to Beloit, Wisconsin. During World War II, he served in the United States Navy. He graduated from the University of Wisconsin, where he also became a member of the faculty. He died in Saint Petersburg, Florida, on August 31, 1998.

Political career
Belting was a member of the Assembly from 1957 to 1970. He was a Republican.

References

People from De Soto, Wisconsin
Politicians from Beloit, Wisconsin
Republican Party members of the Wisconsin State Assembly
Military personnel from Wisconsin
United States Navy sailors
United States Navy personnel of World War II
University of Wisconsin–Madison alumni
University of Wisconsin–Madison faculty
1914 births
1998 deaths
20th-century American politicians